Nihal Sri Ameresekere is a Sri Lankan professional & litigation support consultant, author on fraud and corruption and public interest activist.

He once was an advisor and consultant to the Ministry of Finance & Planning and Plan Implementation, and thereafter as Chairman of Public Enterprises Reform Commission and Chairman & Director of Private Sector Infrastructure Development Co. Ltd. and Hotel Developers (Lanka) Ltd. under the nomination of Sri Lankan President Chandrika Bandaranaike Kumaratunga. He resigned from these positions effective November the 11th 2005.

Career
Nihal Sri Ameresekere has litigated in the general public interest.

Ameresekere once challenged the Sri Lankan Government's Appropriation Bill in the Supreme Court of Sri Lanka and raised several issues with the Government's Fiscal transparency and accountability to the public.

He is a member of the International Association of Anti-Corruption Authorities and an associate member of the American Bar Association.

Association of Certified Fraud Examiners, the world's leading provider of anti-fraud training and education, has awarded Ameresekere, 'Certified Fraud Examiner(CFE)' designation.

Ameresekere has been appointed a Director on the board of directors of the International Consortium on Governmental Financial Management.

In December 2015, Ameresekere was involved in controversy due to a then unpaid overdraft of LKR 100Mn drawn on a state bank in December 2014 (ie, during the previous regime). Ameresekere stated he could repay the money within one month because he was owed a larger sum by the Treasury, supplying a letter from the Deputy Secretary to the Treasury, S.R. Attygalle, to that effect.

Bibliography

He has authored series of professional books on real case studies dealing with corruption, fraud, economic crime, public finance, governance and the rule of law.

References

External links
  www.consultants21.com (Official website)

Living people
Sinhalese writers
People from Kandy
1947 births
Alumni of S. Thomas' College, Mount Lavinia